Dao Look Gai or Dao Luk Gai, also known as the Chick Stars or Pleiades (M45), is a Thai folk tale from Surin province, in northeastern Thailand. It is a fable that explains why Pleiades is called Dao Look Gai (Thai: Dao 'star'; Look Gai or Luk Gai 'chick') and why it has 7 stars in the sky.

This fable is popular in central, northern and northeastern Thailand. It is still told, due to the fact that many Thai artists created a song that related to it. This song is often played with Thai instruments for special events, ceremonies or lessons for kids or students.

Story 
Once upon a time, at a forest edge, there was an old couple who lived in a small cottage. They had no children. The only thing they had was a hen that had seven tiny chicks. Every day the old man and old women went out to the forest to get some lumbers, wild fruits and wild vegetables. They had to get up early to feed the hen and seven chicks. Even though sometimes they did not have much food to feed them, the hen did not mind then took her children to find something to eat by herself.

One day, there was a monk came to the forest and stayed under the big tree near the old couple's cottage temporarily. The old man and old woman wanted to show their respect by giving the monk some food. Unfortunately they did not have much vegetable or fruit to cook for him at that time. The only thing they had was the hen so they decided to kill it in the morning next day.

While the old couple was talking, the hen accidentally heard all the conversation they talked to each other. The hen was so depressed, however she did not think to escape and went back to the stable to see her children. The hen told everything she heard from the old couple to seven chicks then they held each other and cried a lot. The little chicks told her mother to leave this place together but she refused. The hen said the old couple took good care of her since she was a tiny chick and now it was time to repay them. The hen said goodbye to the seven chicks. She held them closely and spent time with them for the last night.

Next morning, the old man came to the stable and caught the hen while the old women prepared to cook it. When she made the fire ready, the old man put the hen in the hot pot. The hen screamed loudly because of the pain she got before she died. The seven chicks heard their mother's voice then they came to see her immediately. When they saw their mother's body, their hearts were broken, then looked at each other and threw themselves in the fire to join their mother.

Moral 

The moral of this story is 'To be grateful to someone who take good care of you' like the hen who never thinks to escape from the old couple even if she knew that they will come to kill her soon.

The another one we should look at is 'the love' - The love of the hen to the old couple and her seven chicks and the love of the seven chicks to their mother.

References

Bibliography 
 
 Vathanaprida, Supaporn. Thai Tales: Folktales of Thailand. Libraries Unlimited, 1994. pp. 39-41 (text), 128-129 (classification).
 Velder, Christian. Märchen Aus Thailand. Jena: Eugen Didierichs Verlag, 1968. pp. 5-7 (text), 273 (classification).

External links 
 How the Pleiades Came into Being
 นิทานพื้นบ้านจังหวัดสุรินทร์เรื่อง ดาวลูกไก่ โดย นางสาวนิฤมณ มั่นยืน
 วิเคราะห์คุณค่าวรรณกรรมพื้นบ้าน ตำนานดาวลูกไก่
 ตำนานดาวลูกไก่
 นืทานดาวลูกไก่ 

Thai folklore
Folklore and literature
Astronomical myths